Mya Nan Nwe, also known as Thaiknanshin (lit. "keeper of the treasure trove") or more popularly known among Thai people as Amadaw Mya is a prominent Burmese nat. She was known to be a dragon guarding the Botahtaung Pagoda.

Lifetime 

Mya Nan Nwe was born on 22 December 1897 in Mogok, British Burma. She is the descendant of Saopha, and daughter of Chan Thar and Nann Kham. At 15-years-old, she was educated in India and graduated with B.A in 1926. From Mogok, dignitaries wanted to marry her, but she refused. She did not eat meat from an early age. In 1942, in her dream, an old man in white robes told her that she should move to Yangon as a missionary. So, she moved to Botataung Pagoda Road, Yangon, and worshiped Botataung Pagoda daily. She had been called Princess of Green as she wore green clothes. She contributed to religious works, including the rebuilding of the Botahtaung Pagoda after its destruction during World War II.

Some believe that she was a daughter of a nāga.

Deification

Mya Nan Nwe died in Mogok in February 1956, due to complications related to long-term asthma. After her death in 1957, Mya Nan Nwe became a revered figure in her own right. In 1990, her shrine was erected inside the Botahtaung Pagoda, and from that point on she was worshipped as Mya Nan Nwe Dewi (Goddess), a nat with the power to grant the wishes of those who appealed to her for help. She was known to be a nāga who guards the pagoda. Hundreds of people come to this place to donate offertories and also to ask for blessing of the sister.

Shrine 
The shrine attracts 700 worshippers per day, and between 1,000 and 3,000 worshippers on weekends, including many Thai devotees. She gained popularity in Thailand through a Thai television program featured her biography.

The oppressive dictator Than Shwe had ordered her statue to be handcuffed every night during his rule. It is said that she appeared in the dictator's dream asking him to stop oppressing the citizens of Myanmar. The dictator was notably highly superstitious and saw this as a bad omen, hence ordering her statue in the shrine to be handcuffed at night.

See also
Botataung Pagoda

References

Burmese nats
Burmese goddesses
1906 births
1956 deaths
Thai goddesses